James Atkins may refer to:

 James Atkins (baseball) (1921–2009), American baseball pitcher
 James Atkins (offensive tackle) (born 1970), American football offensive tackle
 James Atkins (defensive tackle) (born 1978), American football defensive tackle
 James Atkins (nurseryman) (1804–1884), known for being a galanthophile
 James Atkins (artist) (born 1978), American artist

See also 
 James Atkin, Baron Atkin (1867–1944), British lawyer and judge